Honorary Poets are called 'Myung-ye Si-in' in Korea and are the honorary members of the Society of Korean Poets.
Originally, the members of the Society of Korean Poets are subject to poets.
However, if a person approves and respects the purpose of the association and contributes greatly to the advancement of Korean poet literature, he serves as an honorary member of the Society of Korean Poets.
An Honorary Poets shall decide through the Board of Directors under the Society's Articles of Association. 

The first honorary award was on November 1, 1987. It marks the first day of Poetry Day in Korea. 
Moreover, it is also the third day that 'Hurrah for the Poets', which became the beginning of the popular 'Si-nangsong'(poetry recitation). 

Kim Sung-woo was chosen as the first Honorary Poet to earn recognition for his achievement that launched poetry recitation movement through 'Hurrah for the Poets'. Since then, Kim Soo-nam, Kim Yang-dong, Park Sung-hoon and Shin Chang-jae have been honored. There are only five Honorary Poets devoted by the Society of Korean Poets so far.

The 'Hurrah for the Poets' was a large-scale poetry recitation event in Korea. The first 'Hurrah for the Poets' was hosted by the 'Weekly Korea' in 1967 at the Sejong Center in Seoul. The event was held to mark the 60th anniversary of Korea's modern poetry. There were over 3,000 audience members and 32 poet members. The second poet was held in the Korea Literary & Arts Center in 1986 as the host of the 'Weekly Korea'. The event was broadcast on South Korean television, and it was the first time that the poetry recitation contest was broadcast. The third 'Hurrah for the Poets' was celebrated in 1987 for 80th anniversary of Korea's modern poetry, as mentioned earlier. The fourth anniversary was held to mark the 100th anniversary of Korea's modern poetry in 2008 as the host of the JEI Corporation and KBS.

List of Honorary Poets

See also
Si-nangsong 
Society of Korean Poets
Poetry reading
World Poetry Day

References

External links
 poetry recitation 
 A book of Honorary Poets

Performing arts in South Korea